Pembina Trails School Division is a school division serving the southwest communities of Winnipeg, Manitoba, with 35 schools.

The Pembina Trails Teachers' Association represents approximately 1,200 professional staff employed by the Pembina Trails School Division.

Schools

References

External links 
 PembinaTrails School Division on Twitter
 Pembina Trails School Division on Facebook
 Pembina Trails School Division Map

School divisions in Winnipeg